The following works deal with the cultural, political, economic, military, biographical and geologic history of pre-territorial Idaho, Idaho Territory and the State of Idaho.

Surveys of Idaho history
 
 
 
 
 
 
   Volume 2,
 
  Volume 2, Volume 3, Volume 4

Historic expeditions

Hayden Geological Survey (1871)

Lewis and Clark Expedition (1804-1806)

Business and labor

Indians

Military histories

Primary sources

Local and regional histories

Law and order

Ghost towns

Biographies

Memoirs and primary sources

Political histories

Social history

Geology

See also
 Bibliography of Montana history
 Bibliography of Wyoming history
 Bibliography of Yellowstone National Park

Notes

Bibliography
  (reprints of the original works which were published over the period 1937 to 1942. Extensive run of these bibliographies of United States communities and states prepared by workers of the WPA, under the direction of Douglas C. McMurtrie.)
 

History of Idaho
Bibliographies of the United States and territories
Bibliographies of history